William J. Wilson House is a historic home located near Gastonia, Gaston County, North Carolina.  It was built about 1824, and is a two-story, five bay, Federal style frame dwelling.  It has a side-gable roof and exterior brick end chimneys.  It features a one-story, Late Victorian porch with porte cochere.

It was listed on the National Register of Historic Places in 1976.

References

Houses on the National Register of Historic Places in North Carolina
Federal architecture in North Carolina
Victorian architecture in North Carolina
Houses completed in 1824
Houses in Gaston County, North Carolina
National Register of Historic Places in Gaston County, North Carolina